Riot City Ravens (RCR)  is a roller derby league based in Newport, Wales. The league was founded in 2014 and trains twice a week, members regularly scrimmage with other leagues in South Wales.

The league is entered into the 2015 British Roller Derby Championships.

References

Sport in Newport, Wales
Roller derby in Wales
Roller derby leagues in the United Kingdom
Roller derby leagues established in 2014
2014 establishments in Wales